The 1982 Major League Baseball postseason was the playoff tournament of Major League Baseball for the 1982 season. The winners of each division advance to the postseason and face each other in a League Championship Series to determine the pennant winners that face each other in the World Series. 

Every team from the 1981 postseason missed the playoffs this year, except the Milwaukee Brewers, who returned for the second straight year. The California Angels returned to the postseason for the second time in four years, the Atlanta Braves returned to the postseason for the first time since 1969, and the St. Louis Cardinals made their first postseason appearance of the divisional era.

The playoffs began on October 5, 1982, and concluded on October 20, 1982, with the Cardinals defeating the Brewers in seven games in the 1982 World Series. This was the first title since 1967 for the Cardinals and their ninth overall.

Playoff seeds
The following teams qualified for the postseason:

American League
 Milwaukee Brewers - 95–67, Clinched AL East
 California Angels - 93–69, Clinched AL West

National League
 St. Louis Cardinals - 92–70, Clinched NL East
 Atlanta Braves - 89–73, Clinched NL West

Playoff bracket

American League Championship Series

Milwaukee Brewers vs. California Angels

This was the first playoff matchup between two expansion teams. Down two games to none, the Brewers managed to rally and defeat the Angels in 5 games en route to their first World Series in franchise history.

In Anaheim, the Angels blew out the Brewers in Game 1 as Tommy John pitched a complete game, and then won Game 2 by a 4-2 score to go up two games to none headed to Milwaukee. The Brewers narrowly took Game 3 as closer Pete Ladd held off a late rally by the Angels. Game 4 was an offensive duel which was won by the Brewers, 9-5, as they evened the series. In Game 5, the Brewers overcame a late Angels lead to win as Cecil Cooper drove in two runs with an RBI single, clinching the pennant. The Brewers became the first team in LCS history to come back from a two games to none deficit to win the pennant. This would be the last playoff series win by the Brewers until 2011.

The Angels returned to the postseason in 1986, but they would lose to the Boston Red Sox in the ALCS. It would be in 2002 that the Angels would finally win the pennant, as well as the World Series.

As of 2023, this is the only time the Brewers won a pennant.

National League Championship Series

Atlanta Braves vs. St. Louis Cardinals

This was the first postseason meeting between the Cardinals and Braves. The Cardinals swept the Braves and returned to the World Series for the first time since 1967.

This series was heavily lopsided in favor of the Cardinals - Bob Forsch pitched a complete game shutout as the Cardinals blew out the Braves, 7-0, in Game 1. The Braves held a 3-2 lead after seven innings, but the Cardinals rallied with one run scored in the bottom of the eighth and ninth innings respectively to take a 2-0 series lead headed to Atlanta. In Game 3, the Cardinals jumped out to a big lead early and maintained it, as Joaquín Andújar and closer Bruce Sutter held the Braves' offense at bay to help the Cardinals win 6-2 and clinch the pennant.

The Braves would not return to the postseason until 1991, where they went on a long postseason appearance streak which ended in 2005. The Braves and Cardinals would meet again in the NLCS in 1996, where the Braves defeated the Cardinals in seven games to capture their second straight NL pennant after trailing three games to one.

This was the first of three NL pennants won by the Cardinals during the 1980s, as they would win it again in 1985 against the Los Angeles Dodgers, and in 1987 against the San Francisco Giants.

1982 World Series

Milwaukee Brewers (AL) vs. St. Louis Cardinals (NL) 

This was the first World Series since 1968 to not feature a team from New York, Pennsylvania, Maryland, Ohio, or California.

This was the first time the World Series was played in the state of Wisconsin since 1958, when the then-Milwaukee Braves, the defending World Series champions, were defeated by the New York Yankees in seven games. It was also the first postseason meeting between the Brewers and Cardinals. The Brewers took a 3-2 series lead going back to St. Louis, but the Cardinals took Game 6 and came back late in Game 7 to win their first title since 1967. This marked the fourth consecutive World Series win by the National League.

In St. Louis, the Brewers blew out the Cardinals, 10-0, to take Game 1 as Mike Caldwell pitched a three-hit complete game shutout. The Cardinals narrowly won Game 2 to even the series going to Milwaukee. The Cardinals won Game 3 by a 6-2 score to take a 2-1 series lead and regain the home field advantage. Then, the Brewers won Games 4 and 5 by two runs to be one win away from their first ever World Series title. When the series moved back to St. Louis, the Cardinals routed the Brewers by a 13-1 score to force a Game 7, with John Stuper pitching a complete game for the Cardinals. In Game 7, the Brewers led 3-1 going into the bottom of the sixth, until Brewers' manager Harvey Kuenn pulled starting pitcher Pete Vuckovich after the Cardinals got men on first and third bases with one out. This decision proved to be fatal for the Brewers, as the Cardinals scored three runs to take the lead, and then scored two more unanswered runs in the bottom of the eighth to secure the title. 

This would be the final postseason appearance by the Brewers as a member of the American League. They would return to the postseason in 2008 as a member of the National League. The Cardinals would make two more World Series appearances during the decade, in 1985 and 1987, losing both to the Kansas City Royals and Minnesota Twins respectively. The Brewers and Cardinals would meet again in the 2011 NLCS, which the Cardinals also won. The Cardinals would not win the World Series again until 2006, where they defeated the Detroit Tigers in five games.

References

External links
 League Baseball Standings & Expanded Standings - 1982

 
Major League Baseball postseason